Cephalophyllum is a genus of plants in the family Aizoaceae.

Species
 
 
 Cephalophyllum alstonii Marloth ex L.Bolus
 Cephalophyllum brevifolium L. Bolus
 Cephalophyllum caespitosum H.Hartmann
 Cephalophyllum compressum L.Bolus
 Cephalophyllum confusum (Dinter) Dinter & Schwantes
 Cephalophyllum conicum L. Bolus
 Cephalophyllum corniculatum (L.) Schwantes
 Cephalophyllum curtophyllum (L.Bolus) Schwantes
 Cephalophyllum diversiphyllum (Haw.) N.E.Br.
 Cephalophyllum ebracteatum (Schltr. & Diels) Dinter & Schwantes
 Cephalophyllum fulleri L.Bolus
 Cephalophyllum goodii L.Bolus
 Cephalophyllum griseum (S.A.Hammer & U.Schmiedel) H.E.K.Hartmann
 Cephalophyllum hallii L.Bolus
 Cephalophyllum herrei L.Bolus
 Cephalophyllum inaequale L.Bolus
 Cephalophyllum loreum (L.) Schwantes
 Cephalophyllum niveum L.Bolus
 Cephalophyllum numeesense H.E.K.Hartmann
 Cephalophyllum parvibracteatum (L.Bolus) H.E.K.Hartmann
 Cephalophyllum parviflorum L.Bolus
 Cephalophyllum parvulum (Schltr.) H.E.K.Hartmann
 Cephalophyllum pillansii L.Bolus
 Cephalophyllum pulchellum L.Bolus
 Cephalophyllum pulchrum L.Bolus
 Cephalophyllum purpureo-album (Haw.) Schwantes
 Cephalophyllum rangei L. Bolus
 Cephalophyllum regale L.Bolus	
 Cephalophyllum rigidum L.Bolus	
 Cephalophyllum rostellum (L.Bolus) E.K.H.Hartmann	
 Cephalophyllum serrulatum L.Bolus	
 Cephalophyllum spissum H.E.K.Hartmann	
 Cephalophyllum staminodiosum L.Bolus	
 Cephalophyllum subulatoides (Haw.) N.E.Br.	
 Cephalophyllum tetrastichum H.E.K.Hartmann	
 Cephalophyllum tricolorum (Haw.) N.E.Br.

External links
 Bio on Crescent Bloom

 
Aizoaceae genera
Taxonomy articles created by Polbot
Taxa named by N. E. Brown
Taxa named by Adrian Hardy Haworth